Mark William Militano (born March 28, 1954 in Rockville Centre, New York) is an American pair skater. With sister Melissa Militano, he is the 1973 U.S. national champion. They represented the United States at the 1972 Winter Olympics where they placed 7th.

Militano began skating seriously by the age of 7.  Two years later, he formed a pair with his sister Melissa.  They lived on Long Island and were trained by Peter Dunfield at Sky Rink in New York City.

Militano had an early interest in composing music, and he and his sister skated to one of his compositions when they were still in their teens.  Later in life, Militano wrote music that was used by Nancy Kerrigan for her short programs at both the 1992 and 1994 Winter Olympics.

As of 2010, Militano and his wife, former competitor Jana Sjodin, run a coaching, music, and choreography business in the Minneapolis area, Milimar Inc.

Competitive highlights
(with Melissa Militano)

References

External links
 
 Milimar Inc. web site

American male pair skaters
Figure skaters at the 1972 Winter Olympics
Olympic figure skaters of the United States
1954 births
Living people
People from Rockville Centre, New York